On 11 January 2023, the driver of a black BMW X3 deliberately rammed his vehicle into a crowd of pedestrians and motorists on Tianhe Road in Guangzhou, China. Five people were killed and 13 others were injured. A 22-year-old man was arrested in connection to the attack and subsequently charged with endangering public safety by dangerous means.

Background 
The site of the attack, which occurred during evening rush hour, is one of the busiest, densely packed commercial districts in Guangzhou. The intersection at Tianhe and Tiyu East Road, where most of the causalities occurred, is known as "the busiest intersection in Guangzhou." The crosswalk connects two shopping plazas together.

Attack 
At approximately 17:25 on 11 January 2023, the driver turned south from Tianhe Road to Tiyu East Road, running over several pedestrians who were passing through the intersection. After driving to Tiyu East Road, he struck a pedestrian at the intersection of Tianhe South Road. He then returned to the first attack site and drove into more pedestrians. Driving east to Tianhe Road, he hit two delivery drivers and a bicycle rider near the Shipaiqiao Bus Station. He then turned into the intersection at Tianhe East Road and Tianhe South 2nd Road, where he struck more pedestrians. The driver proceeded to ram into a traffic policeman riding on a motorcycle, who survived. The car finally stopped after crashing into a guard rail that separated the motor lane from the bike lane.   

The suspect proceeded to exit the vehicle and throw Renminbi banknotes on the ground. He also attempted to flee the scene, but was subdued by witnesses in the area. As the suspect was being arrested, he claimed that his uncle was Huang Kunming, the Communist Party secretary of Guangdong and a member of the Politburo of the Chinese Communist Party.

Five people died in the attack, the youngest being a six-year-old girl, and 13 others were injured. The wounded victims were taken to and treated at local hospitals.

Collision timeline

Suspect 
At 19:36 on the night of the attack, Guangzhou police announced they arrested a suspect, Wen Mou (Chinese: 温某), a 22-year-old man from Jieyang. Three days later, he was charged with endangering public safety by dangerous means. Red Star News contacted Wen's father, who stated that at about 12:00, his son said he was going out to find friends, and then drove away.

Reactions 

After the incident, citizens went to a station near the scene of the incident to lay flowers in mourning. 

Guangzhou police were criticized by the public for referring to the incident as a traffic accident. Some accused them of attempting to downplay the severity of the attack. The incident became a top trending topic on Weibo and other Chinese social media platforms. However, posts and comments relating to the attack were removed 24 hours later, leading to censorship allegations against Weibo.

See also 

 List of rampage killers (vehicular homicide)

References 

Vehicular rampage in China
2023 road incidents
2020s road incidents in Asia
January 2023 events in China
History of Guangzhou
Attacks in Asia in 2023
Filmed killings